Jane Chika Oranika (born March 9, 1997), known mononymously as Chika (often stylized CHIKA), is an American rapper. She first garnered attention on social media before signing to Warner Records in 2019. The following year, she was included in XXLs 2020 Freshman Class and was nominated for the Grammy Award for Best New Artist.

Early life
Chika was born in Montgomery, Alabama. Because of her interest in music and slam poetry, she attended Booker T. Washington Magnet High School. She was accepted at the prestigious Berklee College of Music, but due to tuition costs, she enrolled at the University of South Alabama instead. She dropped out after her first year to focus on a music career.

Career

Music
Chika first gained widespread attention following an Instagram post from November 9, 2016, the day after the 2016 United States presidential election. In the video, she covers herself in pale foundation, saying "African-American? Never felt that, never heard of that, never tasted that, never smelled that". Early in 2017, she created the #EgoChallenge, using the Beyoncé song of that title to promote body positivity and self-love. That year she also released a Pride-themed remix of Ed Sheeran's "Shape of You". On June 4, 2017 she released an independent EP of poetry called Full Bloom.

In 2018, Chika went viral for a freestyle addressed at Kanye West over West's own "Jesus Walks" beat. The freestyle concerned West's support for Donald Trump and caught the attention of Jada Pinkett Smith, Sean "Diddy" Combs, and Erykah Badu. She later released a freestyle dedicated to Nia Wilson. In August 2018, she featured on Rachel Crow's single "Coulda Told Me".

Chika released her debut single, "No Squares", in April 2019. The following month, at the invitation of guest host Lena Waithe, she performed "Richey v. Alabama", another of her songs, on Jimmy Kimmel Live!. The song dealt with the state of Alabama's  2019 abortion bill and was named for a friend of Chika's. That summer, she signed a deal with Warner Records. Chika released two more singles as a lead artist in 2019: "High Rises" and "Can't Explain It" featuring Charlie Wilson. That year, she also featured on JoJo's "Sabotage", which reached number 18 on the Billboard US R&B Digital Downloads.

In December 2019, Chika announced that she was working on her debut extended play titled Industry Games. On January 23, 2020, Chika confirmed the title and posted snippets of music from the EP, telling followers the release was two months away. She released the EP's titular single on February 18. The EP was released on March 12, 2020.
On August 11, 2020, Chika was included on XXLs 2020 Freshman Class. She was nominated for a Grammy Award for Best New Artist. and a NAACP Image Award for Outstanding New Artist. On March 11, 2021 Chika announced that her second EP Once Upon A Time would be released at midnight.

On April 10, 2021, Chika posted a widely publicized note to her Twitter account explaining her decision to retire from music while reflecting on the "mental toll" that life as a musician in the spotlight had taken on her health. In an Instagram Live session in which she interacted with fans following her initial retirement announcement, she criticized "trolls" or "stans" who "dogpile on top of people's other mental problems and make them worse." She specifically cited the effects of online abuse on her ongoing battle with depression on her decision, although she left a small possibility for a comeback in her final statement.

Films
Chika had a role as a high school student in the  2020 Netflix Original film Project Power. She also contributed the track "My Power".

Fashion
In May 2019, Chika featured in a Calvin Klein #MyCalvins advertisement, also writing poetry for the brand's S/S 2019 campaign. That same year, she participated in a Business of Fashion panel at Paris Fashion Week and posed for the December cover of Teen Vogue. She was recognized by Business of Fashion as one of the top 500 people shaping the fashion industry in 2019.

Personal life
Chika is the youngest of her Nigerian-American parents' three daughters. She is of Igbo descent and was raised in the Pentecostal faith.

Chika identifies as bisexual and addresses her sexuality in her music and videos. In her video for "Can't Explain It", she put her own spin on A Different World, one of her favorite sitcoms.

On May 30, 2020, Chika was briefly detained by police at a Los Angeles protest following the police murder of George Floyd. She addressed the incident on social media the following day, emphasizing the peaceful nature of the demonstration prior to police involvement.

Discography

Extended plays

Singles

As lead artist

As featured artist

Music videos

Awards and nominations

References

1997 births
African-American women rappers
African-American poets
African-American songwriters
American women songwriters
American people of Nigerian descent
American spoken word poets
LGBT rappers
Bisexual women
Bisexual songwriters
Bisexual poets
LGBT African Americans
LGBT people from Alabama
American LGBT poets
American LGBT songwriters
GLAAD Media Awards winners
Living people
Musicians from Montgomery, Alabama
Poets from Alabama
Rappers from Alabama
Songwriters from Alabama
University of South Alabama alumni
21st-century African-American people
21st-century American LGBT people
21st-century African-American women
American bisexual writers